Sanja Vukašinović (born 22 October 1997) is a Serbian sports shooter. She finished in fourth place at the 2019 European Games in the Women's 50 metre rifle three positions earning a quota for Serbia for the 2020 Summer Olympics in Tokyo.

References

1997 births
Living people
Serbian female sport shooters
European Games competitors for Serbia
People from Stara Pazova
Shooters at the 2019 European Games
Olympic shooters of Serbia
Shooters at the 2020 Summer Olympics